KTPL (88.3 FM) is a radio station broadcasting a Christian radio format, carrying programming from the Moody Bible Radio network from Chicago.

It was previously branded as "Power 88", which played a blend of upbeat music ranging from Christian CHR artists to Hot 'Praise & Worship' music. The switch to Moody Bible was made on December 15, 2008.

Licensed to Pueblo, Colorado, United States, it serves the Pueblo area. The station is currently owned by Educational Communications Of Colorado Springs.

External links

TPL
Moody Radio affiliate stations
Radio stations established in 1977
TPL